Apéndice Island, also known as Isla Telegrafista Rivera or Sterneck Island, is an island in Hughes Bay lying north of Renzo Point on Relyovo Peninsula and west of Sucia Point on Sladun Peninsula, Graham Land in Antarctica. The name appears on an Argentine government chart of 1957.  It forms part of the Cierva Point and offshore islands Important Bird Area and ASPA 134.

See also 
 List of Antarctic and sub-Antarctic islands

References

 

Islands of Graham Land
Danco Coast
Important Bird Areas of Antarctica
Antarctic Specially Protected Areas